Looking at You may refer to:

Music

Albums
 Looking at You (album), a 1985 album by Chaz Jankel
 Looking at You, a 1968 album by Sandy Posey

Songs
 "Looking at You", a song by Cole Porter published in 1929, covered by Johnny Mathis and Mel Tormé among others
 "Across the Breakfast Table, Looking at You", a 1930 song by Irving Berlin for the musical Mammy, covered by Michael Feinstein as "Looking at You (Across the Breakfast Table)"
 "Looking at You" (MC5 song), 1970, on the album Back in the USA
 "Looking at You", a 1974 instrumental by David Jackson off the album The Long Hello
 "Looking at You" (Tom Robinson song), 1980 song by the band Sector 27 on the album Sector 27
 "Looking at You", a 1980 song by The Damned off the album The Black Album
 "Looking at You", a 1983 song by Cobra off the album First Strike
 "Looking at You", a 1985 song by Chaz Jankel off the eponymous album Looking at You
 "Looking at You", a 1996 song by Kate Ceberano off the album Blue Box
 "Looking at You", a 2007 song by James Marsters off the album Like a Waterfall
 "Looking at You", a 2009 song by IU off the album Growing Up
 "Looking at You", a 2016 song by Ice Prince off the album Jos to the World

Other uses
 Looking at You, a 2016 art exhibition of works by Eran Shakine

See also

 Look at You (disambiguation)
 Here's Looking at You (disambiguation)
 Here's Looking At You Kid (disambiguation)